Princess Suvadhana (15 April 1906 – 10 October 1985) was the royal consort of King Vajiravudh (or Rama VI) of Siam. Her original name was Khrueakaeo Abhayavongsa. She was born a commoner; her father was Lord Abhayabhupesa (Lueam Abhayavongsa) and her mother was Ms. Lek Bunnag.

Life and marriage

Khrueakaeo first met King Vajiravudh in 1924 during a dramatic production, in which they both acted. Soon after, Khrueakaeo was renamed Suvadhana and elevated to the rank of a minor consort. Later that same year they were married at the Grand Palace in Bangkok. Although King Vajiravudh initiated many Siamese nationalistic policies of the 1920s, his queen Suvadhana was of Khmer descent of Phratabong province (Battambang). Suvadhana's grand aunt, Khun Chom Iem Busba, was the wife of King Norodom I of Cambodia. 

When Suvadhana became pregnant in 1925, the King elevated her rank to that of Phra Nang Chao Suvadhana (HRH Princess Suvadhana, Princess Consort of Siam). Not soon after the King fell gravely ill, on the 24 November 1925, Suvadhana gave birth to a daughter, Princess Bejaratana Rajasuda.

Exile in England

The Princess and her daughter continued to live at the Dusit Palace, raising her daughter during the reign of her husband's younger brother King Prajadhipok.  In 1938, as war loomed, the Princess and her daughter emigrated to the United Kingdom, following the example of Prajadhipok who went in exile there in 1935. First she lived at Fairhill Villa in Camberley, Surrey, she later moved to Brighton. During the Second World War the Princess volunteered for the British Red Cross, donating winter clothes and other equipments to British soldiers; she later received a letter of recommendation from the organization. She would spend 22 years in England, she made her own living by investing in stocks and bonds; living a comfortable lifestyle with Thai servants.

Return and later life
The Princess and her daughter returned to Thailand permanently in 1957. They bought some land on Sukhumvit Road Soi 38, and build the Ruenruedi Villa Palace.  During her later years she carried out many royal duties and became patron of many charitable organizations. Suvadhana died at Siriraj Hospital on the 10 October 1985 at the age of 79, her funeral was presided over by King Bhumibol Adulyadej (or Rama IX) and Queen Sirikit.

Honours
  The Most Illustrious Order of the Royal House of Chakri
  Dame Grand Cross (First Class) of The Most Illustrious Order of Chula Chom Klao
  Ratana Varabhorn Order of Merit
  King Rama VI Royal Cypher Medal (First Class)
  King Rama VII Royal Cypher Medal (Second Class)
  King Rama IX Royal Cypher Medal (First Class)
  The Red Cross Commendation Medal

Ancestors

References

 Phra Nang Chao Suvadhana Kreuakaew Abhayavongsa

External links
 Official website
 The Bunnag Lineage Club

1906 births
Thai people of Khmer descent
1985 deaths
Abhaiwongse family
20th-century Thai women
20th-century Chakri dynasty
Thai princesses consort
Ratana Varabhorn Order of Merit
Dames Grand Cross of the Order of Chula Chom Klao
Princesses by marriage